Sloughhouse is an unincorporated community in Sacramento County, California, United States. Sloughhouse has a post office with ZIP code 95683, which was established in 1916. Jared Sheldon, who built a roadhouse in the community in the 1850s, named the community after another building he had built nearby. The site is registered as a California Historical Landmark.

Climate
According to the Köppen Climate Classification system, Sloughhouse has a warm-summer Mediterranean climate, abbreviated "Csa" on climate maps.

References

Unincorporated communities in Sacramento County, California
Unincorporated communities in California